Admiral  Aurangzeb Chowdhury, (G), NBP, OSP, BCGM, PCGM, BCGMS, ndc, psc, BN, (born 28 September 1959) is a former four star Admiral of Bangladesh and the former Chief of Staff of the Bangladesh Navy. Previously, he held the post of Director General of the Bangladesh Coast Guard.

Early life
Abu Mozaffar Mohiuddin Mohammed Aurangzeb Chowdhury was born on 28 September 1959. He received his commission into the Bangladesh Navy in 1980.

Career
He has held a number of positions in the Bangladesh Navy. He was commanding officer of a frigate, among other ships. He served as the Commandant of the Bangladesh Marine Academy from November 2008 to March 2009.  He served as the Commodore Superintendent Dockyard from October 2009 to December 2010. He also served as the Assistant Chief of Naval Staff (Operations) and Assistant Chief of Naval Staff (Personnel) at Navy HQ. He served as the Commodore Commanding Chittagong, Naval Secretary & Directors at NHQ, Zonal Commander of Coast Guard East Zone and principal of the Bangladesh Marine Fisheries Academy, Chittagong etc.

He was made the Director General of Bangladesh Coast Guard on 15 February 2016. He took over the office as Chief of Naval Staff on 26 January 2019 and retires on 25 July 2020.

Personal life 
He is married to gynecologist Afroza Aurangzeb. The couple has a son and a daughter.

References

|-

1959 births
Living people
Director Generals of Bangladesh Coast Guard
Chiefs of Naval Staff (Bangladesh)
People from Feni District
Bangladeshi Navy admirals